Bufkin is an unincorporated community in Black Township, Posey County, in the U.S. state of Indiana.

History
A post office was established at Bufkin in 1890, and remained in operation until it was discontinued in 1902.

Geography

References

Unincorporated communities in Posey County, Indiana
Unincorporated communities in Indiana